Einsatzleiter (Action Leader) was a mid-level Nazi Party political rank created in 1939 as a replacement for the older rank of Amtsleiter.  Like its predecessor, the rank of Einsatzleiter was a generic staff position common across all levels of the Party, typically assigned to administrative or clerical duties.

Insignia

References
 Clark, J. (2007). Uniforms of the NSDAP. Atglen, PA: Schiffer Publishing

Nazi political ranks